Mahmudabad-e Azali (also Romanized as Maḩmūdābād-e Āzalī; also known as Maḩmūdābād, Moḩammadābād, Muhammadābād, and Muhaniprābād) is a village in Nakhlestan Rural District, in the Central District of Kahnuj County, Kerman Province, Iran. At the 2006 census, its population was 239, in 51 families.

References 

Populated places in Kahnuj County